Ginebra San Miguel, Inc. (GSMI) (formerly, La Tondeña Distillers, Inc.) is a Philippines-based diversified beverage company majority-owned by San Miguel Food and Beverage, Inc.

History

La Tondeña was established in 1902 by Carlos Palanca, Sr. in Tondo, Manila and incorporated as La Tondeña, Inc. in 1929. The company name was inspired from its location. The distillery pioneered the production of alcohol derived from molasses, instead of the commonly used nipa palm.

In 1924, it acquired the Ayala Distillery (Destilería Ayala) from Ayala y Compañía (precursor of Ayala Corporation). In 1955, the company acquired Añejo Rhum from Tabacalera (Compañía General de Tabacos de Filipinas). In 1957, it acquired the trademark rights to Kulafu to launch Vino Kulafu Chinese herbal wine.

The company was renamed La Tondeña Distillers, Inc. (LTDI) in 1987 after being acquired by San Miguel Corporation from the Palanca family. The company adopted its present name Ginebra San Miguel, Inc. on March 7, 2003.

On November 6, 2017, San Miguel Corporation announced the consolidation of its beverage businesses into San Miguel Pure Foods Company, Inc. through a share swap deal. San Miguel Pure Foods will acquire 216.97 million shares in GSMI from San Miguel Corporation. As a result, San Miguel Pure Foods will own 76% of GSMI with San Miguel Corporation as the minority owner. After the consolidation, San Miguel Pure Foods will be renamed San Miguel Food and Beverage, Inc.

Ginebra San Miguel brand history

In June 1834, Casa Róxas established the Ayala Distillery, the first distillery in the Philippines. It produced a variety of drinks including anis, anisette, cognac, rum, whisky and gin (Ginebra Ayala, Ginebra San Miguel, Ginebra Nacional, Ginebra Extra, Ginebra Doble Extra, among others). The distillery was located in Quiapo, Manila and was a major business of Ayala y Compañía (successor of Casa Róxas) when it was acquired by La Tondeña on June 21, 1924.

Monde Selection awards

GSMI has received eight Quality Awards (five golds and three silvers) at the 2012 World Quality Selections, organized yearly by Monde Selection. Three of the brands have also earned the Monde Selection's International High Quality Trophy, granted to products achieving Grand Gold or Gold Awards for three consecutive years.

Sports teams
 Barangay Ginebra San Miguel (PBA)

See also
1975 La Tondeña strike

References

External links
 Ginebra San Miguel, Inc.
 San Miguel Corporation

Drink companies of the Philippines
San Miguel Corporation brands
San Miguel Corporation subsidiaries
Food and drink companies established in 1902
Companies listed on the Philippine Stock Exchange
Companies based in Mandaluyong
Distilleries in the Philippines
Philippine alcoholic drinks
1902 establishments in the Philippines